Nikolaos Foskolos (born 11 December 1936 in Komi, Tinos, Greece) was the Archbishop of Athens and Apostolic Administrator of the Roman Catholic Archdiocese of Rhodes.

Biography

Foscolos was ordained priest on 1 October 1961. On 25 June 1973 he was appointed Archbishop of Athens and on 12 August 1973 he was ordained Archbishop by Ioannis Perris, Archbishop of Naxos, Andros, Tinos and Mykonos. From 1973 until his resignation on 12 August 2014 he was Roman Catholic Archbishop of Athens and Apostolic Administrator of the Roman Catholic Archdiocese of Rhodes, whom he was named in 1992. From 1992 to 2004 Foskolos was president of the Episcopal Conference of Greece. His successor in both offices is the Rev. Fr. Sevastianos Rossolatos.

References

External links 
 https://www.catholic-hierarchy.org/bishop/bfoscolos.html

1936 births
Living people
Greek Roman Catholic archbishops
Roman Catholic archbishops of Athens
Roman Catholic archbishops of Rhodes
People from Tinos